Goodner is a surname. Notable people with the surname include:

Carol Goodner (1904–2001), American actress
Gary Goodner (born 1949), Puerto Rican swimmer
John Goodner (1944–2005), American football coach
Lillian Goodner (1896 –1994), African-American blues singer
Michael Goodner (born 1953), Puerto Rican swimmer